Wilfried Bingangoye (born March 25, 1985) is a Gabonese athlete specializing in the 100 metres. His personal best time is 10.48 seconds, achieved in August 2009 in Castres.

Participating in the 2004 Summer Olympics, he achieved eighth place in his 100 metres heat, failing to secure qualification to the second round. He did however run his then personal best time of 10.76 seconds. He also competed at the World Championships in 2005, 2007 and 2009. He finished sixth at the 2008 African Championships. Participating in the 2008 Summer Olympics, he achieved sixth place in his 100 metres heat, failing to secure qualification to the second round.  At the 2012 Summer Olympics, he finished third in his preliminary round heat, failing to progress further. At the 2016 Summer Olympics, he finished fifth in his preliminary round heat, and did not advance.

Competitions Record

References

External links
 

1985 births
Living people
Gabonese male sprinters
Athletes (track and field) at the 2004 Summer Olympics
Athletes (track and field) at the 2008 Summer Olympics
Athletes (track and field) at the 2012 Summer Olympics
Athletes (track and field) at the 2016 Summer Olympics
Olympic athletes of Gabon
World Athletics Championships athletes for Gabon
21st-century Gabonese people